Bulgaria–Czech Republic relations are foreign relations between Bulgaria and the Czech Republic. Diplomatic relations between Bulgaria and Czechoslovakia were established on 27 September 1920, after ratification of Neuilly treaty. They were severed on 1 June 1939 and were restored on 10 October 1945. Interwar relations were deeply influenced by Yugoslavia, Czechoslovakian ally, but Bulgarian rival. Czechoslovakia had to balance between Bulgaria and Yugoslavia. The most important aspect of Bulgaria–Czechoslovakia relationship was trade. The Czechoslovakian interwar export to Bulgaria varied between 3% and 11% of the Bulgarian import. Otherwise it was about 0.5%. Czechoslovakian export was slowly forced out by Germany in the late thirties, but not as much as France or United Kingdom.

On 23 December 1992, Bulgaria recognised the Czech Republic and established diplomatic relations with it at the level of embassies as of 1 January 1993.

Bulgaria has an embassy and an honorary consulate in Prague. Czech Republic has an embassy in Sofia and an honorary consulate in Varna.
Czech Republic has given full support to Bulgaria's membership in the European Union and NATO.

See also 
 Foreign relations of Bulgaria
 Foreign relations of the Czech Republic
 Accession of Bulgaria to the European Union

External links 
 Bulgarian embassy in Prague
 Czech Republic embassy in Sofia

 
Czech Republic 
Bilateral relations of the Czech Republic